Confessions of a Wife is a 1928 American silent drama film directed by Albert H. Kelley and starring Helene Chadwick, Walter McGrail and Ethel Grey Terry.

A married woman loses huge amounts of money playing cards. She is blackmailed by her creditors into gaining them access to a ball where the wealthy will all be wearing their most expensive jewellery. She agrees to their terms, but also contacts the police who are able to thwart the plot.

Cast
 Helene Chadwick as Marion Atwell 
 Arthur Clayton as Paul Atwell 
 Ethel Grey Terry as Mrs. Livingston 
 Walter McGrail as Henri Duval 
 Carl Gerard as Handsome Harry 
 Clarissa Selwynne as Mrs. Jonathan 
 Sam Lufkin as Bumby Lewis 
 De Sacia Mooers as Dupree 
 Suzanne Rhoades as Annette Pringle

References

Bibliography
 Munden, Kenneth White. The American Film Institute Catalog of Motion Pictures Produced in the United States, Part 1. University of California Press, 1997.

External links

1928 films
1928 drama films
Silent American drama films
Films directed by Albert H. Kelley
American silent feature films
1920s English-language films
American black-and-white films
1920s American films